Cotycicuiara is a genus of longhorn beetles of the subfamily Lamiinae, containing the following species:

 Cotycicuiara alternata Galileo & Martins, 2008
 Cotycicuiara bahiensis Galileo & Martins, 2008
 Cotycicuiara boliviana Galileo & Martins, 2008
 Cotycicuiara latifascia Galileo & Martins, 2008
 Cotycicuiara multifasciata Galileo & Martins, 2008
 Cotycicuiara venezuelensis Galileo & Martins, 2008

References

Acanthoderini